Raghuvansh Prasad Singh (6 June 1946 – 13 September 2020) was an Indian socialist politician. In the Lok Sabha, he represented the Vaishali constituency of Bihar and was the national vice president of the Rashtriya Janata Dal political party. He was one of the senior most politicians in India as a people's representative in the legislature for four decades from 1977.

He started his political career when he was elected as an MLA and was subsequently made the Energy minister of Bihar in the Karpoori Thakur ministry. He had represented Belsand constituency five times in the Bihar vidhan sabha. He was made the member of Bihar legislative council in a 1991 post. He became the chairman of Bihar legislative council. He has represented Vaishali constituency from Bihar in Lok Sabha consecutively for five terms and has been in the Union cabinet for three terms. He was the Union Cabinet Minister for Rural Development in UPA-I of Manmohan Singh's government and is credited with conceptualization and implementation of NREGA (National rural employment guarantee act).

Singh died from complications from COVID-19 during the COVID-19 pandemic in India at All India Institutes of Medical Sciences in New Delhi on 13 September 2020, at age 74. In his final days, Singh wrote an emotional letter to Lalu Prasad Yadav mentioning the humiliation meted out to him in his last days.

Early life and education
Singh was born in a Rajput family of Bihar. He was born to Ramvriksh Singh in the year 1946. He was a Professor and Ph.D. in mathematics and an expert in rural and agricultural landscape in India.

Political history

 Secretary, Samyukta Socialist Party (S.S.P.), Sitamarhi district (1973–77) 
 Member, Bihar Legislative Assembly (1977–90) 
 Minister of State (Independent charge), Power, Government of Bihar (1977–79) 
 President, Lok Dal, Sitamarhi district (1980–85) 
 Deputy Speaker, Bihar Legislative Assembly (1990)  
 Deputy Leader, Bihar Legislative Council (1991–94)  
 Member, Bihar Legislative Council (1991–95)
 Chairman, Bihar Legislative Council (1994–95)  
 Minister, Energy, Relief, Rehabilitation and Department of Official Languages, Government of Bihar (1995–96)  
 Elected to 11th Lok Sabha (1996)  
 Union Minister of State, Animal Husbandry and Dairying (Independent Charge) (1996–97)  
 Union Minister of State, Food and Consumer Affairs (Independent Charge) (1997–98) 
 Re-elected to 12th Lok Sabha (2nd term) (1998) 
 Re-elected to 13th Lok Sabha (3rd term) (1999)
 Leader, Rashtriya Janata Dal Parliamentary Party, Lok Sabha (1999–2000) 
 Re-elected to 14th Lok Sabha (4th term) (2004) 
 Union Cabinet Minister, Rural Development (2004–09)
 Vice President, Parliamentary Forum on Water Conservation & Management 
 Re-elected to 15th Lok Sabha (5th term) (2009)

Family 
Singh married Kiran Singh and has 2 sons and 1 daughter.

Social and Cultural Activities
He was associated with the socialist, Teachers' and Farmers' movements as well as activities related to nation building.

Special Interests

His special interests included social service, the struggle against exploitation, legal aid to the farmers, the labourers and the oppressed, as well as promotion of education and educational reforms.
 
Sports, clubs, favourite pastimes and recreation

He was interested in Yoga, exercise and music. Among the countries he visited were South Korea, Germany, U.K., Mauritius and U.S.A.

Other Information

He was imprisoned during the socialist movement, Lok Nayak Jayaprakash Narayan movement and involved in several political agitations.

See also
List of politicians from Bihar

References

Notes

See also
List of politicians from Bihar

External links

 Official biographical sketch in Parliament of India website
 

|-

1946 births
2020 deaths
India MPs 1996–1997
India MPs 1998–1999
India MPs 1999–2004
India MPs 2004–2009
India MPs 2009–2014
Bihari politicians
Chairs of the Bihar Legislative Council
Deaths from the COVID-19 pandemic in India
Deputy Speakers of the Bihar Legislative Assembly
Janata Dal politicians
Lok Sabha members from Bihar
Members of the Bihar Legislative Assembly
Members of the Bihar Legislative Council
People from Vaishali district
Rashtriya Janata Dal politicians
Samyukta Socialist Party politicians
State cabinet ministers of Bihar
Union ministers of state of India
United Progressive Alliance candidates in the 2014 Indian general election
Janata Dal (Secular) politicians
Lok Dal politicians